= Air Corporations Employees Union =

Trade union in India

Air Corporations Employees Union (ACEU) is the largest union at India's flag carrier Air India, with a membership of 8000 out of 21,000 employees at the airline. It represents non-technical staff. The union opposes the Government of India's plan to privatize the airline. The union is led by JB Kadyan.

In August 2015, ACEU, along with Air India Employees Union became the two recognized unions representing workers at the airline and its ground-handling unit following the airline's first union elections. Previously, there were 14 different registered unions with members. A key reason for the elections was to reduce the number of unions to bring efficiency to the bargaining process.
